AS Paroșeni Vulcan was a Romanian football club based in Vulcan, Hunedoara County, founded in 1970 and dissolved in 1997.

History
Minerul Paroșeni was founded in 1970 and played until 1976–77 season in the 5th division, when the team was ranked first and promoted to Hunedoara County Championship.  After three seasons, in 1979–80, with Tiberiu "Puiu" Benea as a coach, Minerul Paroșeni promoted to Divizia C, winning the county championship and the promotion play-off with 2–0 on aggregate against the champion of Gorj County, Constructorul Târgu Jiu. The squad that achieved the promotion was composed of: Crecan-Stanci, Gânga, Urițescu, M.Florea - I.Popescu, Lascu, G.Iordache - B.Popescu, Leleșan, Gâtan.

In the 1980–81 season, in a series with strong teams, Carpați Mârșa, Sticla Arieșul Turda or Victoria Călan, Minerul Paroșeni behave honorably at the debut in the third division, finishing on the 9th place.
Followed four seasons in which were ranked: 6th (1981–82), 9th (1982–83), 4th (1983–84), and 2nd (1984–85). 

The  black and blue team,  after a strong battle with CSM Lugoj and Rapid Arad in 1985–86 season, promoted in Divizia B. The team included the following players: Crecan (V.Bârsan)- Dodenciu, Leleșan, Lixandru (Hădărean), C.Ispir (Adrian Rusu) - Lăzăroiu, Gelu Bârsan, Mircea Cristea - Neculai Băltaru (Gâtan), Romulus Matula, Sorin Henzel (Neiconi)- Coach: Tiberiu "Puiu" Benea. In all these years there was an intense rivalry with the other team from the city, Minerul Știința Vulcan. 

The 1986–87 Divizia B season was the best for "The Miners", occupying a meritorious 6th place and qualifying in Round 32 of the Cupa României where they were eliminated by Universitatea Craiova 1–1 after extra time and 4–5 in a penalty shootout. 
In the next season, 1987–88, the club was renamed as AS Paroșeni Vulcan and finishing in 7th place. AS Paroșeni relegated to the Divizia C at the end of the 1988–89 season as a result of the weakest rank obtained in the second tier, 16th place. 

Following their relegation, AS Paroșeni Vulcan spent the next eight season playing in Divizia C, period in which the best rank was 4th in 1991–92 season. After finishing 19th in the 1996–97 season, AS Paroșeni Vulcan relegated in Divizia D and due to financial problems was merged with their main rival Minerul Știința Vulcan.

Honours
Divizia C
Winners (1):1985–86
Runners-up (1):1984–85
Hunedoara County Championship
Winners (1):1979–80
Runners-up (1):1978–79

Other performances 
Appearances in Liga II: 3
Appearances in Liga III: 14
Best finish in Liga II: 6th  (1986–87)
Best finish in Cupa României: Round of 32 (1986–87)

League history

References

Defunct football clubs in Romania
Football clubs in Hunedoara County
Association football clubs established in 1970
Association football clubs disestablished in 1997
Liga II clubs
Liga III clubs
Liga IV clubs
1970 establishments in Romania
1997 disestablishments in Romania